Chintaman Ganesh railway station is a small railway station in Ujjain, Madhya Pradesh, which is built near the Chintaman Ganesh Temple. Its code is CNN. This railway station is built across the Shipra River on the Ujjain–Fatehabad broad-gauge railway line. The station consists of double platform. The platform is well sheltered. The main railway station of Ujjain, Ujjain Junction, is always preferred over Chintaman Ganesh station for catching several trains.

In 2014, the station was closed due to gauge conversion of the Ujjain–Fatehabad line from meter gauge to broad gauge.

This railway station was re-opened in 2021, after the gauge conversion of the Ujjain - Fatehabad was completed, several amenities were also added to it.

See also

 Ujjain Junction
 Ujjain
 Indore

References

External links 

 Chintaman Ganesh railway station

Railway stations in Ujjain district
Buildings and structures in Ujjain
Ratlam railway division
Transport in Ujjain
Railway stations in Ujjain
Year of establishment missing